Klára Langhoffer-Pétervári (born 31 August 1955) is a Hungarian rower. She competed in the women's double sculls event at the 1980 Summer Olympics.

References

1955 births
Living people
Hungarian female rowers
Olympic rowers of Hungary
Rowers at the 1980 Summer Olympics
Rowers from Budapest